Shkin may refer to:
Shkin, Paktika, Paktika Province, Afghanistan
Shkin, Paktia, Paktia Province, Afghanistan